Odonthalitus fuscomaculatus is a species of moth of the family Tortricidae. It is found in Michoacán, Mexico.

The length of the forewings is 7.5 mm. The forewings are cream with nearly uniform brown overscaling and irregular brown striae. The hindwings are pale grey brown.

Etymology
The species name refers to the dark overscaling of the forewings.

References

Moths described in 2000
Euliini